The Shadow King is a 2019 novel by Ethiopian-American writer Maaza Mengiste, published by W. W. Norton & Company on September 24, 2019. It was shortlisted for the 2020 Booker Prize.

The novel focuses on the Second Italo-Ethiopian War which resulted in the Ethiopians putting an end to Italian occupation.

Reception 
Namwali Serpell, writing for The New York Times, described the novel as 'lyrical' and 'remarkable'.

Alex Clark, in The Guardian, described the novel as 'absorbing' and said that Mengiste's achievement was to "bring to life those women, and to depict them as dynamic entities".

Film adaptation 
In April 2020, it was announced that Kasi Lemmons would direct a film adaptation of The Shadow King.

References

2019 American novels
American historical novels
Novels set in Ethiopia
W. W. Norton & Company books
Ethiopian-American history